Oddlab was a small independent game development company based in Denmark. It was founded in 2001 by students from the University of Southern Denmark.

Oddlabs has released Tribal Trouble, a Java 3D strategy game.

In 2014, Oddlabs closed their website and everything related to Tribal Trouble. They released the source code of Tribale Trouble under GPL2 license, but they closed the servers making it impossible to unlock the full version or play multiplayer without changing the source code.

References

External links
Oddlabs - The game alchemists
Tribal Trouble source on GitHub

Video game companies of Denmark